Valentin Abel (born 7 February 1991) is a German politician. He has been a Member of the Bundestag from Baden-Württemberg since the 2021 German federal election.

Early life and career 
Abel was born in Künzelsau and graduated from the University of Mannheim. From 2016 until 2021, he worked at Texas Instruments.

Political career 
Abel contested Schwäbisch Hall – Hohenlohe in 2017 and 2021. In 2021 he was elected to the Bundestag on the state list. In parliament, he has since been serving on the Committee on Transport and the Committee on Petitions. He is his parliamentary group’s rapporteur on cycling.

In addition to his committee assignments, Abel is part of the German-Austrian Parliamentary Friendship Group.

Other activities 
 Federal Network Agency for Electricity, Gas, Telecommunications, Posts and Railway (BNetzA), Member of the Rail Infrastructure Advisory Council (since 2022)

References 

Living people
1991 births
21st-century German politicians
Members of the Bundestag for Baden-Württemberg
Members of the Bundestag for the Free Democratic Party (Germany)
Members of the Bundestag 2021–2025
People from Künzelsau

University of Mannheim alumni